Oliver Eaton Cromwell Jr. (1892–1987), widely known as Tony Cromwell, was an American mountain climber who made many first ascents in the Canadian Rockies and was a member of the 1939 American Karakoram expedition to K2.

Mount Cromwell, a mountain in the Sunwapta River Valley of Jasper National Park, in Alberta, Canada, was named after him. The mountain was named in 1972 by J. Monroe Thorington, to commemorate Cromwell's many first ascents in the Canadian Rockies, including his 1938 first ascent of his namesake mountain.

The year after his first ascent of Mount Cromwell, Cromwell was a member, and base camp commander, of the tragic 1939 American Karakoram expedition to K2. In 1939, Cromwell and two fellow expedition leaders were implicated in a combination of miscommunication and poor decisions which contributed to the deaths of four expedition climbers.

After the K2 expedition, Cromwell relocated to Zermatt, Switzerland until the 70's, then relocated to Interlaken, Switzerland.

Family and facts
 Stepson of Edward T. Stotesbury
 Brother of Louise Cromwell Brooks, and James H. R. Cromwell
 Former brother-in-law of Douglas MacArthur, Doris Duke, Delphine Dodge, and Lionel Atwill

References

1892 births
1987 deaths
American mountain climbers